Michel Roques (20 July 1946 – 8 October 2006) was a French racing cyclist. He rode in the 1973 Tour de France.

References

External links
 

1946 births
2006 deaths
French male cyclists
Place of birth missing